Roll-on/roll-off (RORO or ro-ro) ships are cargo ships designed to carry wheeled cargo, such as cars, motorcycles, trucks, semi-trailer trucks, buses, trailers, and railroad cars, that are driven on and off the ship on their own wheels or using a platform vehicle, such as a self-propelled modular transporter. This is in contrast to lift-on/lift-off (LoLo) vessels, which use a crane to load and unload cargo.

RORO vessels have either built-in or shore-based ramps or ferry slips that allow the cargo to be efficiently rolled on and off the vessel when in port. While smaller ferries that operate across rivers and other short distances often have built-in ramps, the term RORO is generally reserved for large seafaring vessels. The ramps and doors may be located in the stern, bow, or sides, or any combination thereof.

Description 

Types of RORO vessels include ferries, cruiseferries, cargo ships, barges, and RoRo service for air deliveries. New automobiles that are transported by ship are often moved on a large type of RORO called a pure car carrier (PCC) or pure car/truck carrier (PCTC).

Elsewhere in the shipping industry, cargo is normally measured by the tonne, but RORO cargo is typically measured in lanes in metres (LIMs). This is calculated by multiplying the cargo length in metres by the number of decks and by its width in lanes (lane width differs from vessel to vessel, and there are several industry standards). On PCCs, cargo capacity is often measured in RT or RT43 units (based on a 1966 Toyota Corona, the first mass-produced car to be shipped in specialised car-carriers and used as the basis of RORO vessel size. 1 RT is approximately 4m of lane space required to store a 1.5m wide Toyota Corona) or in car-equivalent units (CEU).

The RORO passenger ferry with the greatest car-carrying capacity is Ulysses (named after a novel by James Joyce), owned by Irish Ferries. Ulysses entered service on 25 March 2001 and operates between Dublin and Holyhead.

Car carriers 

The first cargo ships specially fitted for the transport of large quantities of cars came into service in the early 1960s. These ships still had their own loading gear and so-called hanging decks inside. They were, for example, chartered by the German Volkswagen AG to transport vehicles to the U.S. and Canada. During the 1970s, the market for exporting and importing cars has increased dramatically and the number and type of ROROs has increased also.

In 1970 Japan's K Line built the Toyota Maru No. 10, Japan's first pure car carrier, and in 1973 built the European Highway, the largest pure car carrier (PCC) at that time, which carried 4,200 automobiles. Today's pure car carriers and their close cousins, the pure car/truck carrier (PCTC), are distinctive ships with a box-like superstructure running the entire length and breadth of the hull, fully enclosing the cargo. They typically have a stern ramp and a side ramp for dual loading of thousands of vehicles (such as cars, trucks, heavy machineries, tracked units, Mafi roll trailers, and loose statics), and extensive automatic fire control systems.

The PCTC has liftable decks to increase vertical clearance, as well as heavier decks for "high-and-heavy" cargo. Lifting decks to accommodate higher cargo reduces the total capacity.

With the building of Wallenius Wilhelmsen Logistics's 8,000 car-equivalent unit (CEU) car carrier Faust out of Stockholm in June 2007, car carriers entered a new era of the large car and truck carrier (LCTC). Currently, the largest are Höegh Autoliners, six Horizon class vessels with capacity of 8,500 CEU each.

The car carrier Auriga Leader, belonging to Nippon Yusen Kaisha, built in 2008 with a capacity of 6,200 cars, is the world's first partially solar powered ship.

Seaworthiness 
The seagoing RORO car ferry, with large external doors close to the waterline and open vehicle decks with few internal bulkheads, has a reputation for being a high-risk design, to the point where the acronym is sometimes derisively expanded to "roll on/roll over". Water sloshing on the vehicle deck can set up a free surface effect, making the ship unstable and causing it to capsize.

Despite these inherent risks, the very high freeboard raises the seaworthiness of these vessels. For example, the car carrier  listed 60 degrees to its port side in 2006, but did not sink, since its high enclosed sides prevented water from entering.

In late January 2016  was listing off France after cargo shifted on the ship. Salvage crews secured the vessel and it was hauled into the port of Bilbao, Spain.

Some RORO ship casualties are mentioned here.

RORO variations

History
At first, wheeled vehicles carried as cargo on oceangoing ships were treated like any other cargo. Automobiles had their fuel tanks emptied and their batteries disconnected before being hoisted into the ship's hold, where they were chocked and secured. This process was tedious and difficult, and vehicles were subject to damage and could not be used for routine travel.

An early roll-on/roll-off service was a train ferry, started in 1833 by the Monkland and Kirkintilloch Railway, which operated a wagon ferry on the Forth and Clyde Canal in Scotland.

Invention

The first modern train ferry was Leviathan, built in 1849. The Edinburgh, Leith and Newhaven Railway was formed in 1842 and the company wished to extend the East Coast Main Line further north to Dundee and Aberdeen. As bridge technology was not yet capable enough to provide adequate support for the crossing over the Firth of Forth, which was roughly five miles across, a different solution had to be found, primarily for the transport of goods, where efficiency was key.

The company hired the up-and-coming civil engineer Thomas Bouch who argued for a train ferry with a roll-on/roll-off mechanism to maximise the efficiency of the system. Ferries were to be custom-built, with railway lines and matching harbour facilities at both ends to allow the rolling stock to easily drive on and off. To compensate for the changing tides, adjustable ramps were positioned at the harbours and the gantry structure height was varied by moving it along the slipway. The wagons were loaded on and off with the use of stationary steam engines.

Although others had had similar ideas, Bouch was the first to put them into effect, and did so with an attention to detail (such as design of the ferry slip) which led a subsequent President of the Institution of Civil Engineers to settle any dispute over priority of invention with the observation that "there was little merit in a simple conception of this kind, compared with a work practically carried out in all its details, and brought to perfection."

The company was persuaded to install this train ferry service for the transportation of goods wagons across the Firth of Forth from Burntisland in Fife to Granton. The ferry itself was built by Thomas Grainger, a partner of the firm Grainger and Miller.

The service commenced on 3 February 1850. It was called "The Floating Railway" and intended as a temporary measure until the railway could build a bridge, but this was not opened until 1890, its construction delayed in part by repercussions from the catastrophic failure of Thomas Bouch's Tay Rail Bridge.

Expansion
Train-ferry services were used extensively during World War I. From 10 February 1918, high volumes of railway rolling stock, artillery and supplies for the Front were shipped to France from the "secret port" of Richborough, near Sandwich on the South Coast of England.

This involved three train-ferries to be built, each with four sets of railway line on the main deck to allow for up to 54 railway wagons to be shunted directly on and off the ferry. These train-ferries could also be used to transport motor vehicles along with railway rolling stock. Later that month a second train-ferry was established from the Port of Southampton on the South East Coast. In the first month of operations at Richborough, 5,000 tons were transported across the Channel, by the end of 1918 it was nearly 261,000 tons.

There were many advantages of the use of train-ferries over conventional shipping in World War I. It was much easier to move the large, heavy artillery and tanks that this kind of modern warfare required using train-ferries as opposed to repeated loading and unloading of cargo. By manufacturers loading tanks, guns and other heavy items for shipping to the front directly on to railway wagons, which could be shunted on to a train-ferry in England and then shunted directly on to the French Railway Network, with direct connections to the Front Lines, many man hours of unnecessary labour were avoided.

An analysis done at the time found that to transport 1,000 tons of war material from the point of manufacture to the front by conventional means involved the use of 1,500 labourers, whereas when using train-ferries that number decreased to around 100 labourers. This was of utmost importance, as by 1918, the British Railway companies were experiencing a severe shortage of labour with hundreds of thousands of skilled and unskilled labourers away fighting at the front.  The increase of heavy traffic because of the war effort meant that economies and efficiency in transport had to be made wherever possible.

After the signing of the Armistice on 11 November 1918, train ferries were used extensively for the return of material from the Front.  Indeed, according to war office statistics, a greater tonnage of material was transported by train ferry from Richborough in 1919 than in 1918. As the train ferries had space for motor transport as well as railway rolling stock, thousands of lorries, motor cars and "B Type" buses used these ferries to return to England.

The landing ship, tank

During World War II, landing ships were the first purpose-built seagoing ships enabling road vehicles to roll directly on and off. The British evacuation from Dunkirk in 1940 demonstrated to the Admiralty that the Allies needed relatively large, seafaring ships capable of shore-to-shore delivery of tanks and other vehicles in amphibious assaults upon the continent of Europe. As an interim measure, three 4000 to 4800 GRT tankers, built to pass over the restrictive bars of Lake Maracaibo, Venezuela, were selected for conversion because of their shallow draft. Bow doors and ramps were added to these ships, which became the first tank landing ships.

It was a scaled down design from ideas penned by Churchill. To carry 13 Churchill infantry tanks, 27 vehicles and nearly 200 men (in addition to the crew) at a speed of 18 knots, it could not have the shallow draught that would have made for easy unloading. As a result, each of the three (Boxer, Bruiser, and Thruster) ordered in March 1941 had a very long ramp stowed behind the bow doors.

In November 1941, a small delegation from the British Admiralty arrived in the United States to pool ideas with the United States Navy's Bureau of Ships with regard to development of ships and also including the possibility of building further Boxers in the US. During this meeting, it was decided that the Bureau of Ships would design these vessels. As with the standing agreement these would be built by the US so British shipyards could concentrate on building vessels for the Royal Navy. The specification called for vessels capable of crossing the Atlantic and the original title given to them was "Atlantic Tank Landing Craft" (Atlantic (T.L.C.)).

The LST(2) design incorporated elements of the first British LCTs from their designer, Sir Rowland Baker, who was part of the British delegation. This included sufficient buoyancy in the ships' sidewalls that they would float even with the tank deck flooded. The LST(2) gave up the speed of HMS Boxer at only  but had a similar load while drawing only  forward when beaching. In three separate acts dated 6 February 1942, 26 May 1943, and 17 December 1943, Congress provided the authority for the construction of LSTs along with a host of other auxiliaries, destroyer escorts, and assorted landing craft. The enormous building program quickly gathered momentum. Such a high priority was assigned to the construction of LSTs that the previously laid keel of an aircraft carrier was hastily removed to make room for several LSTs to be built in her place. The keel of the first LST was laid down on 10 June 1942 at Newport News, Virginia, and the first standardized LSTs were floated out of their building dock in October. Twenty-three were in commission by the end of 1942.

ROROs for road vehicles

At the end of the first world war vehicles were brought back from France to Richborough Port drive-on-drive-off using the train ferry. During the war British servicemen recognised the great potential of landing ships and craft. The idea was simple; if you could drive tanks, guns and lorries directly onto a ship and then drive them off at the other end directly onto a beach, then theoretically you could use the same landing craft to carry out the same operation in the civilian commercial market, providing there were reasonable port facilities. From this idea grew the worldwide roll-on/roll-off ferry industry of today. In the period between the wars Lt. Colonel Frank Bustard formed the Atlantic Steam Navigation Company, with a view to cheap transatlantic travel; this never materialised, but during the war he observed trials on Brighton Sands of an LST in 1943 when its peacetime capabilities were obvious.

In the spring of 1946 the company approached the Admiralty with a request to purchase three of these vessels. The Admiralty were unwilling to sell, but after negotiations agreed to let the ASN have the use of three vessels on bareboat charter at a rate of £13 6s 8d per day. These vessels were LSTs 3519, 3534, and 3512.

On the morning of 11 September 1946 the first voyage of the Atlantic Steam Navigation Company took place when Empire Baltic sailed from Tilbury to Rotterdam with a full load of 64 vehicles for the Dutch Government. The original three LSTs were joined in 1948 by another vessel, LST 3041, renamed Empire Doric, after the ASN were able to convince commercial operators to support the new route between Preston and the Northern Ireland port of Larne. The first sailing of this new route was on 21 May 1948 by Empire Cedric. After the inaugural sailing Empire Cedric continued on the Northern Ireland service, offering initially a twice-weekly service.  Empire Cedric  was the first vessel of the ASN fleet to hold a passenger certificate, and was allowed to carry fifty passengers. Thus Empire Cedric became the first vessel in the world to operate as a commercial/passenger roll-on/roll-off ferry, and the ASN became the first commercial company to offer this type of service.

The first RORO service crossing the English Channel began from Dover in 1953. In 1954, the British Transport Commission (BTC) took over the ASN under the Labour Governments nationalization policy. In 1955 another two LSTs where chartered into the existing fleet, Empire Cymric and Empire Nordic, bringing the fleet strength to seven. The Hamburg service was terminated in 1955, and a new service was opened between Antwerp and Tilbury. The fleet of seven ships was to be split up with the usual three ships based at Tilbury and the others maintaining the Preston to Northern Ireland service.

During late 1956, the entire fleet of ASN were taken over for use in the Mediterranean during the Suez Crisis, and the drive-on/drive-off services were not re-established until January 1957. At this point ASN were made responsible for the management of twelve Admiralty LST(3)s brought out of reserve as a result of the Suez Crisis too late to see service.

Further developments

The first roll-on/roll-off vessel that was purpose-built to transport loaded semi trucks was Searoad of Hyannis, which began operation in 1956. While modest in capacity, it could transport three semi trailers between Hyannis in Massachusetts and Nantucket Island, even in ice conditions.

In 1957, the US military issued a contract to the Sun Shipbuilding and Dry Dock Company in Chester, Pennsylvania, for the construction of a new type of motorized vehicle carrier. The ship, USNS Comet, had a stern ramp as well as interior ramps, which allowed cars to drive directly from the dock, onto the ship, and into place. Loading and unloading was sped up dramatically. Comet also had an adjustable chocking system for locking cars onto the decks and a ventilation system to remove exhaust gases that accumulate during vehicle loading.

During the 1982 Falklands War,  was requisitioned as an emergency aircraft and helicopter transport for British Hawker Siddeley Harrier STOVL fighter planes; one Harrier was kept fueled, armed, and ready to VTOL launch for emergency air protection against long range Argentine aircraft. Atlantic Conveyor was sunk by Argentine Exocet missiles after offloading the Harriers to proper aircraft carriers, but the vehicles and helicopters still aboard were lost.

After the war, a concept called the shipborne containerized air-defense system (SCADS) proposed a modular system to quickly convert a large RORO into an emergency aircraft carrier with ski jump, fueling systems, radar, defensive missiles, munitions, crew quarters, and work spaces. The entire system could be installed in about 48 hours on a container ship or RORO, when needed for operations up to a month unsupplied. The system could quickly be removed and stored again when the conflict was over. The Soviets flying Yakovlev Yak-38 fighters also tested operations using the civilian RORO ships Agostinio Neto and Nikolai Cherkasov.

See also

 BC Ferries
 Car float
 Cruise ferry
 Frank Bustard
 Intermodal container
 Konkan Railway Corporation
 List of cargo types
 List of roll-on/roll-off vessel accidents
 Roll-on/roll-off discharge facility
 Rolling highway
 RORO ferry service, Gujarat
 Société des traversiers du Québec
 Train ferry
 USNS Sea Lift (T-LSV-9) USN Ro Ro ship
 Washington State Ferries
 Yacht transport

References

Further reading

 
 
 

Cargo ships
Ship types
Freight transport
Scottish inventions

no:RoRo-skip#Bilskip